Rainbow Riley is a 1926 American silent comedy film directed by Charles Hines and starring Johnny Hines, Brenda Bond, and Bradley Barker.

Plot
As described in a film magazine review, Steve Riley, a cub reporter, is sent out to cover a feud between two large families. He becomes the enemy of both, because he wishes to marry Alice, a young woman from one family, and does not wish to marry a young woman of the other, even though she loves him. After a series of dangerous adventures, he is rescued. He returns to the office of his paper with a big story and a new wife.

Cast

Preservation
A fragment of Rainbow Riley is held in the UCLA Film and Television Archive.

References

Bibliography
 Munden, Kenneth White. The American Film Institute Catalog of Motion Pictures Produced in the United States, Part 1. University of California Press, 1997.

External links

1926 films
Silent American comedy films
Films directed by Charles Hines
American silent feature films
1920s English-language films
First National Pictures films
American black-and-white films
Silent films in color
1926 comedy films
1920s American films